Bacon Dream is an EP by Cardiff-based grime music band Astroid Boys. Originally released in 2013 on the label Pinky Swear Records, it was later re-released in 2016 when they signed with Music For Nations.

Track listing 
Side A
 "Bintro" – 2:05
 "Minging/Sticky" – 7:55
 "Hungerstrike" – 3:44
 "Giggs" – 3:35
Side B
 "Rinsa" (Featuring Manga) – 3:57
 "Tayluh Swift" – 3:17
 "Dusted" – 3:54
2013 Exclusive tracks
 Bada$$ (Exclusive on Vinyl release)

References 

2016 EPs
Astroid Boys albums